Nepenthes laevis may refer to:

Nepenthes laevis Lindl. (1848) — synonym of N. gracilis
Nepenthes laevis auct. non Lindl.: C.Morren (1852) — synonym of N. albomarginata

laevis